The eighteenth season of the American television series Whose Line Is It Anyway? premiered on The CW on October 9, 2021.

Production
On May 25, 2021, it was announced that the series would air new episodes on Saturdays for a new season in October 2021. On June 15, 2021, it was announced that the new season would premiere on October 9, 2021.

Cast

Recurring 
 Heather Anne Campbell (two episodes)
 Keegan-Michael Key (two episodes)
 Jeff Davis (two episodes)
 Jonathan Mangum (two episodes)
 Nyima Funk (one episode)
 Greg Proops (one episode)

Episodes 

"Winner(s)" of each episode as chosen by host Aisha Tyler are highlighted in italics. The winner(s) perform a sketch during the credit roll, just like in the original UK series.

References 

Whose Line Is It Anyway?
2021 American television seasons
2022 American television seasons